Glappa of Bernicia ruled from 559 to 560. He was the second known king of Bernicia.

Little is known of Glappa's life and reign.  The earliest authorities differ widely on the order and the regnal years of the kings between the death of Ida (559) and the beginning of Æthelfrith's rule (592/593).  Glappa is not named among the sons given his predecessor, Ida, but appears in regnal lists as Ida's successor, reigning one year.

External links 
 

560 deaths
Bernician monarchs
History of Northumberland
6th-century English monarchs
Year of birth unknown